NHC Arena, formerly NHK Arena, E.ON Arena, Sydkraft Arena and Timrå Isstadion, is an indoor sporting arena located in Timrå, Västernorrland County, Sweden. Construction began in 1964 and was inaugurated on 4 September 1966. Since then the venue has undergone several renovations and expansions. It is home arena of the SHL ice hockey team Timrå IK. Current capacity is 6 000.

History

The current building was constructed in 2003 on the grounds of, and re-using the roof from the old Timrå Isstadion. This predecessor dates back to 1966 and was inaugurated September 4, the same year, as the eighth ice hockey venue in Sweden. The old arena underwent a heavy refresh for the 1994/1995 season, resulting in a capacity of 5,500. When Timrå IK was promoted to the Swedish Hockey League in year 2000, the old Timrå Isstadion was timeworn and didn't met the requirement for a modern ice hockey venue so a second major reconstruction was made prior to season 2003/2004, resulting in today's capacity of 6 000, still far from the all-time high arena audience record from 20 January 1972 of 11 695 paying spectators when Timrå IK played against Brynäs IF.

Video cube
In Oktober 2018 a new video cube was installed in NHC Arena with a screen size of 170 square meters, among Europe's largest. It replaced the earlier one which was installed in 2005. The venture was jointly financed by Timrå IK and Northern Hall and Cover (NHC). The new video cube was inaugurated 18 Oktober 2018 in a SHL game against Rögle BK.

Lill-Strimma hallen

In the early 1990s, the need for a new ice hockeyrink grew. The youth teams often had late training sessions in NHC Arena or had to play on the field. With the help of Timrå Municipality and many non-profit forces, construction started of Lill-Strimmahallen, adjacent to NHC Arena. The hall was ready for the 1991/1992 season and was then Sweden's 251st ice rink.

The inauguration had to wait until Lill-Strimma's 50th birthday (if he lived on) on 16 Dec. 1994. The name became the logical "Lill-Strimmahallen". In total, the hall cost SEK 16 million. Lill-Strimmahallen has a capacity of 300 spectators.

Overview

See also
 List of indoor arenas in Sweden
 List of indoor arenas in Nordic countries

References

Books

Web pages

External links
Timrå IK homepage
Pictures and facts (unofficial)

Indoor ice hockey venues in Sweden
Ice hockey venues in Sweden
Sport in Timrå
Sports venues completed in 1966
1966 establishments in Sweden